The Sun Vow is an 1899 bronze sculpture by American artist Hermon Atkins MacNeil. It was cast in 1919 and measures  x  x . The sculpture is part of the Metropolitan Museum of Art's collection.

References

External links
 

1899 sculptures
Bronze sculptures in New York City
Nude sculptures in New York (state)
Sculptures of Native Americans
Sculptures of the Metropolitan Museum of Art
Statues in New York City
1899 establishments in New York City